The men's trios competition at the 2018 Asian Games in Palembang was held on 23 August 2018 at Jakabaring Bowling Center.

Block 1 were played on long oil pattern lane, while Block 2 were played on medium oil pattern lane.

Schedule
All times are Western Indonesia Time (UTC+07:00)

Results

References

External links
Official website

Men's trios